Macropodia falcifera, the Cape long-legged spider crab, is a species of marine crab found around the South African coast. It is a member of the family Inachidae.

Distribution
The Cape long-legged spider crab is found from 15 to at least 35 m underwater, from the Cape Peninsula to East London. It is endemic to this region.

Description
Its pincers are considerably sturdier than its legs and are tipped with white claws. The body is pinkish or reddish, and the legs and pincers are usually a darker red.

Ecology
The animals often decorate themselves with hydroids or algae, and are often found on sea fans.

References

Majoidea
Crustaceans described in 1857